The following is a list of the Perry Mason novels and short stories by Erle Stanley Gardner, published from 1933 to 1973.

Many Perry Mason novels were first published in magazines, most often The Saturday Evening Post, some with different titles. Sixteen appeared in the Toronto Star Weekly in condensed form. All books were first published by William Morrow and Company, New York. Most were published simultaneously in Toronto.

Six of the novels were adapted for a series of Perry Mason films produced in the 1930s. Many of the novels and short stories were adapted for the CBS television series Perry Mason (1957–1966); details are available at the list of episodes for the TV series.

The Perry Mason series ranks third in the top ten  best selling book series, with sales of 300 million. R. L. Stine's Goosebumps series is ranked second, with over 400 million; J. K. Rowling's Harry Potter series is first, with over 500 million.

Novels

1930s
 The Case of the Velvet Claws (1933)William Morrow and Company, March 1933In the first Perry Mason mystery, we meet Perry, Della Street and detective Paul Drake for the first time. District Attorney Hamilton Burger and Lieutenant Arthur Tragg do not appear in this story. There is no courtroom scene in the entire novel, which is routine in the later books. The plot revolves around a spoiled woman, who calls herself "Eva Griffin". She comes to Mason claiming that she is being blackmailed by her powerful husband. She wants to keep the news of her affairs secret from him and seeks help from Mason. Meanwhile, she is accused of murder and, in turn, puts the blame on Mason himself. But Perry avoids being double-crossed and fights to free her from the charges.
 The Case of the Sulky Girl (1933)William Morrow and Company, September 1933A bratty heiress wants to keep the news of a man in her life a secret from the guardian who controls her purse strings. Then, when there is a murder, that same man is accused.
 The Case of the Lucky Legs (1934)William Morrow and Company, February 1934 Perry tries to represent a woman taken in by a con man. Other women show up conned by the same man, and their boyfriends show up, and suddenly there is a death. A mistake at the murder scene dogs Perry, as he tries to figure out what is going on before something happens to him...
 The Case of the Howling Dog (1934)Serialized in Liberty Magazine, January 13 – March 17, 1934; William Morrow and Company, June 1934When a potential client wants to see Mason about a howling dog and a will, the attorney is uninterested. He does not enjoy drafting wills, and wonders if the man should not see a veterinarian. However, the man's next question, whether a will is legal if the person who made it had been executed for murder, immediately piques Mason's interest. He finds, in addition to the will and the dog, a man who had run away with the wife of another, and a sexy housekeeper. The Hollywood movie of this name is considered the best big screen adaptation of a Perry Mason book.
 The Case of the Curious Bride (1934)Serialized in Liberty Magazine, July 7 – September 15, 1934; William Morrow and Company, November 1934A woman claiming not to be a bride consults Mason about her "friend" whose husband, long thought to have died in a plane crash, turns up alive.
 The Case of the Counterfeit Eye (1935)William Morrow and Company, April 1935Peter Brunold has a bloodshot glass eye to use the "morning after." It is distinctive, closely identified with him, and thus a handicap when a corpse is found clutching a bloodshot glass eye. Later, another corpse is found, with another bloodshot glass eye in hand. But Mason is in almost as much jeopardy as his client, as his fingerprints have been found on one of the alleged murder weapons. This is the first novel in which District Attorney Hamilton Burger appears.
 The Case of the Caretaker's Cat (1935)Serialized in Liberty Magazine, June 15 – August 17, 1935; William Morrow and Company, September 1935After his employer dies in a fire, a caretaker hires Mason to allow him to keep his cat against the wishes of the men who inherit. When the caretaker is killed, Mason defends the man accused of his murder.
 The Case of the Sleepwalker's Niece (1936)William Morrow and Company, March 1936When two men change bedrooms at a house party, everyone thinks that the sleepwalker with the carving knife killed the wrong man. This is not the first novel in which Perry kisses Della Street in the office. Della and Perry first kissed in The Case of the Velvet Claws.
 The Case of the Stuttering Bishop (1936)William Morrow and Company, September 1936Mason gets a telephone call from a man who identifies himself as Anglican Bishop William Mallory, recently returned from many years in Australia, and tells Mason that he will testify on the behalf of Mason's client, if Mason can find him. But Mason observes that a bishop who has delivered many sermons is unlikely to stutter.
 The Case of the Dangerous Dowager (1937)William Morrow and Company, April 1937Mason is hired to retrieve a spoiled granddaughter's gambling IOUs by a wealthy cigar-smoking dowager. A murder aboard a gambling ship is beyond the three-mile limit.
 The Case of the Lame Canary (1937)Serialized in The Saturday Evening Post, May 29 – July 17, 1937; William Morrow and Company, September 1937A snoopy neighbor and a canary whose claws have been cut too short give the clues to an illicit affair and a murder.
 The Case of the Substitute Face (1938)William Morrow and Company, April 1938During a dark and stormy night aboard ship, a man goes missing. A portrait photograph is mysteriously changed out of a frame. Mason must solve the mystery to save a life.
 The Case of the Shoplifter's Shoe (1938)William Morrow and Company, September 1938Mason defends an elderly woman who claims to have no memory of shooting a man, but he needs to know why she would go shoplifting when she has plenty of money in her purse.
 The Case of the Perjured Parrot (1939)William Morrow and Company, February 1939One of Perry Mason's trademarks is his ability, in court, to switch the physical evidence in a case. He generally does this with guns or bullets, and it confuses the jury, to his client's advantage. In this case, Perry offers a coroner's inquest two parrots, one of which swore like a muleskinner and was found near the body of a millionaire hermit who had been murdered.Jacques Barzun and Wendell Hertig Taylor, A Catalogue of Crime: "This early Perry Mason is uncommonly full of detection, and the games played in it with parrots do not detract from plausibility. Denouement not huddled—all in all, a model in his special genre."
 The Case of the Rolling Bones (1939)William Morrow and Company, November 1939A murder during the Alaskan Gold Rush has ramifications that lead to murder in the present day. This is the first novel for Mason's intrepid switchboard operator, Gertie.

1940s

1950s

1960s

Posthumous

Short stories

 "The Case of the Crying Swallow" (1947)The American Magazine, August 1947Published with The Case of the Cautious Coquette (1949) and then in a short story collection The Case of the Crying Swallow published in 1970.
 "The Case of the Crimson Kiss" (1948)The American Magazine, June 1948Published with The Case of the Cautious Coquette (1949) and then in a short story collection The Case of the Crimson Kiss published in 1971.
 "The Case of the Suspect Sweethearts" (1950)Radio and Television Mirror, May 1950; radio series tie-in with Della Street's byline
 "The Case of the Irate Witness" (1953)Collier's, January 17, 1953First book publication Fiction Goes to Court : Favorite Stories of Lawyers and the Law Selected by Famous Lawyers (1954) and later included in the short story collections The Case of the Irate Witness in 1970, and The Oxford Book of Detective Stories (2000).

Not Perry Mason novels
Every Perry Mason story has a title that begins "The Case of the …" but there are five books by Gardner with similar titles that are not Perry Mason novels:
 The Case of the Turning Tide (1941), first of two Gramps Wiggins novels
 The Case of the Smoking Chimney (1943), the second Gramps Wiggins novel
 The Case of the Backward Mule (1946), second of two books featuring Terry Clane
 The Case of the Musical Cow (1950), featuring Rob Trenton
 The Case of the Murderer's Bride (1969), various short stories and novelettes

Pastiche
After Gardner's death, Thomas Chastain wrote two Perry Mason novels licensed by the author's estate, "based on characters created by Erle Stanley Gardner". Both follow the made-for-TV movies in the use of Paul Drake, Jr.

 Perry Mason in The Case of Too Many Murders (1989) – A businessman seems to have been in two places at once—once as a murderer, once as a victim.
 Perry Mason in The Case of the Burning Bequest (1990) – Mason's client has apparently killed his mother-in-law-to-be in the same room where his fiancée's real mother was killed by the client's father. The case is complicated further by the client's refusal to exonerate himself.

See also
 Erle Stanley Gardner bibliography

Notes

References

Fictional amateur detectives
Fictional lawyers
Mystery fiction bibliographies
Novel series
Perry Mason
Novels set in Palm Springs, California

pt:Anexo:Lista de obras de Erle Stanley Gardner#Perry Mason